The Decree of War to the Death, in Spanish Decreto de Guerra a Muerte, was a decree issued by the South American leader Simón Bolívar which permitted murder and any atrocities whatsoever to be committed against civilians born in Spain, other than those actively assisting South American independence, and furthermore exonerated people from the Americas who had already committed such murders and atrocities. The phrase "war to the death" was used as a euphemism for these atrocities.

The decree was an explicit "war of extermination" in Bolívar's attempt to maintain Venezuelan independence in the war with Spain, since he felt that the Spanish Army's use of atrocities against those who supported the First Republic of Venezuela had contributed decisively to its defeat.

Bolívar promulgated the decree on June 15, 1813, in the Venezuelan city of Trujillo.

Background
The decree states that it was created as a response to severe crimes and massacres by Spanish soldiers after the fall of the First Republic, in which Spanish leaders allegedly stole property and executed thousands of Republicans: "we could not indifferently watch the afflictions inflicted to you by the barbaric Spaniards, who have annihilated you with robbery and destroyed you with death, infringed the most solemn treaties and capitulations [a reference to the San Mateo Capitulation, 1812]; in one word, committed every crime, reducing the Republic of Venezuela to the most horrific desolation." It proclaimed that all Peninsular people in Spanish America who didn't actively participate in favor of its independence would be killed, and all South Americans would be spared, even if they had cooperated with the Spanish authorities. (See below for full declaration). The document's ultimate goal was to assure the Venezuelan elites that they would not be unfavorably treated for having collaborated with Domingo de Monteverde and the royalist authorities. The Decree was the first step in transforming the common and legal view of the Venezuelan war of liberation from a mere rebellion (or at best a civil war) taking place in one of Spain's colonies, to a full-fledged international war between two distinct countries, Venezuela and Spain.

Practice of the "Guerra a Muerte"
This so-called Guerra a Muerte was widely practised on both sides, resulting in some extreme brutalities on both sides, such as the execution of Spanish prisoners in Caracas and La Guaira in February 1814, on orders from Bolívar himself, just before the collapse of the Second Republic of Venezuela, and the killing of several renowned citizens in New Granada by the royalist army under Pablo Morillo in 1815, 1816 and 1817.

The declaration remained in effect until November 26, 1820, when General Pablo Morillo met with Bolívar at Santa Ana de Trujillo to declare the war of independence a conventional war.

Text of the Decree

References

Bibliography
Stoan, Stephen K. Pablo Morillo and Venezuela, 1815-1820. Columbus: Ohio State University Press, 1959.

External links

Decree of War to the Death (in Spanish) - Available at Archivo del Libertador.
Decree of War to the Death (in Spanish) - Available at Televisora Venezolana Social.

See also 
 Shoot on the Spot Declaration

Venezuelan War of Independence
1813 in Venezuela
War to the Death
Ultimata
June 1813 events
Prisoner of war massacres
War crimes